Karla Elizabeth Rubilar Barahona (born 17 April 1977) is a Chilean physician and politician. During the second government of Sebastián Piñera (2018–2022), she has been a minister twice.

She is a member of the Chilean Medical College.

References

External links
 Profile at Biblioteca del Congreso Nacional
 

1977 births
National Renewal (Chile) politicians
University of Santiago, Chile alumni
Living people
Chilean Ministers Secretary General of Government
Government ministers of Chile
Women government ministers of Chile